Greffulhe may refer to:

People
Countess Élisabeth Greffulhe, born Élisabeth de Riquet de Caraman-Chimay (1860-1952), French aristocrat.
Henri Greffulhe (1815-1879), French politician.
Count Henry Greffulhe (1848-1932), French aristocrat and politician.
Count Jean-Henry-Louis Greffulhe (1774-1820), Dutch-born French banker and politician.
Louis-Charles Greffulhe (1814-1888), French aristocrat and politician.

Other
Greffuhle Stradivarius, a violin.
Prix Greffulhe, a horse race in France.
Rue Greffulhe, a street in Paris, France.